The Tasman River is an alpine braided river flowing through Canterbury, in New Zealand's South Island.

The river's headwaters are in Aoraki / Mount Cook National Park, where it is the outflow of the proglacial Tasman Lake.  It is also fed by the glacial waters of the tributary Murchison River, from Murchison Glacier, and the short Hooker River, an outflow of the proglacial lakes of the Hooker and Mueller glaciers.

The Tasman River flows south for  through the wide flat-bottomed Tasman Valley in the Southern Alps and into the northern end of the glacial Lake Pukaki, this forming part of the ultimate headwaters of the Waitaki hydroelectric scheme.

See also
List of rivers of New Zealand

References

External links

Rivers of Canterbury, New Zealand
Braided rivers in New Zealand
Rivers of New Zealand